The Beer Hall Putsch, also known as the Munich Putsch, was a failed coup d'état by Nazi Party ( or NSDAP) leader Adolf Hitler,  Erich Ludendorff and other  leaders in Munich, Bavaria, on 8–9 November 1923, during the Weimar Republic.

Hitler escaped immediate arrest and was spirited off to safety in the countryside. After two days, he was arrested and charged with treason.

The putsch brought Hitler to the attention of the German nation for the first time and generated front-page headlines in newspapers around the world. His arrest was followed by a 24-day trial, which was widely publicised and gave him a platform to express his nationalist sentiments to the nation. Hitler was found guilty of treason and sentenced to five years in Landsberg Prison, where he dictated  to fellow prisoners Emil Maurice and Rudolf Hess. On 20 December 1924, having served only nine months, Hitler was released. Once released, Hitler redirected his focus towards obtaining power through legal means rather than by revolution or force, and accordingly changed his tactics, further developing Nazi propaganda.

Background 
In the early 20th century, many of the larger cities of southern Germany had beer halls, where hundreds, and sometimes thousands, of people would socialise in the evenings, drink beer and participate in political and social debates. Such beer halls also became the hosts of occasional political rallies.

After the Treaty of Versailles, which ended World War I, Germany declined as a major European power. Like many Germans of the period, Hitler, who had fought in the German Army but still held Austrian citizenship at the time, believed the treaty to be a betrayal, with the country having been "stabbed in the back" by its own government, particularly as the German Army was popularly thought to have been undefeated in the field. For the defeat, Hitler scapegoated civilian leaders, Jews and Marxists, later called the "November Criminals".

Hitler remained in the army in Munich after the war. He participated in various "national thinking" courses, organised by the Education and Propaganda Department of the Bavarian Army under Captain Karl Mayr, of which Hitler became an agent. Captain Mayr ordered Hitler, then an army  (not the equivalent of lance corporal, but a special class of private) and holder of the Iron Cross, First Class, to infiltrate the tiny  ("German Workers' Party", abbreviated DAP). Hitler joined the DAP on 12 September 1919. He soon realised that he was in agreement with many of the underlying tenets of the DAP, and rose to its top post in the ensuing chaotic political atmosphere of postwar Munich. This political base extended to include about 15,000  (SA, literally "Storm Detachment"), the paramilitary wing of the NSDAP.

Hitler announced that he would hold 14 mass meetings beginning on 27 September 1923. Afraid of the potential disruption, one of 's first actions was to ban the announced meetings, placing Hitler under pressure to act.

The putsch 

The putsch was inspired by Benito Mussolini's successful March on Rome.  From 22 to 29 October 1922, Hitler and his associates planned to use Munich as a base for a march against Germany's Weimar Republic government. But circumstances differed from those in Italy. Hitler came to the realisation that Kahr sought to control him and was not ready to act against the government in Berlin. Hitler wanted to seize a critical moment for successful popular agitation and support. He decided to take matters into his own hands. Hitler, along with a large detachment of SA, marched on the Bürgerbräukeller, where Kahr was making a speech in front of 3,000 people.

In the evening of 8 November 1923, 603 SA surrounded the beer hall and a machine gun was set up in the auditorium. Hitler, surrounded by his associates Hermann Göring, Alfred Rosenberg, Rudolf Hess, Ernst Hanfstaengl, Ulrich Graf, Johann Aigner, Adolf Lenk, Max Amann, Max Erwin von Scheubner-Richter, Wilhelm Adam, Robert Wagner and others (some 20 in all), advanced through the crowded auditorium. Unable to be heard above the crowd, Hitler fired a shot into the ceiling and jumped on a chair, yelling: "The national revolution has broken out! The hall is surrounded by six hundred men. Nobody is allowed to leave." He went on to state that the Bavarian government was deposed and declared the formation of a new government with Ludendorff.

Hitler, accompanied by Hess, Lenk, and Graf, ordered the triumvirate of Kahr, Seisser and Lossow into an adjoining room at gunpoint and demanded they support the putsch and accept the government positions he assigned them. Hitler had promised Lossow a few days earlier that he would not attempt a coup, but now thought that he would get an immediate response of affirmation from them, imploring Kahr to accept the position of Regent of Bavaria. Kahr replied that he could not be expected to collaborate, especially as he had been taken out of the auditorium under heavy guard.

Heinz Pernet, Johann Aigne and Scheubner-Richter were dispatched to pick up Ludendorff, whose personal prestige was being harnessed to give the Nazis credibility. A telephone call was made from the kitchen by Hermann Kriebel to Ernst Röhm, who was waiting with his Bund Reichskriegsflagge in the Löwenbräukeller, another beer hall, and he was ordered to seize key buildings throughout the city. At the same time, co-conspirators under Gerhard Rossbach mobilised the students of a nearby infantry officers' school to seize other objectives.

Hitler became irritated by Kahr and summoned Ernst Pöhner, Friedrich Weber, and Hermann Kriebel to stand in for him while he returned to the auditorium flanked by Rudolf Hess and Adolf Lenk. He followed up on Göring's speech and stated that the action was not directed at the police and Reichswehr, but against "the Berlin Jew government and the November criminals of 1918". Dr. Karl Alexander von Mueller, a professor of modern history and political science at the University of Munich and a supporter of Kahr, was an eyewitness. He reported

I cannot remember in my entire life such a change in the attitude of a crowd in a few minutes, almost a few seconds ... Hitler had turned them inside out, as one turns a glove inside out, with a few sentences. It had almost something of hocus-pocus, or magic about it.
Hitler ended his speech with: "Outside are Kahr, Lossow and Seisser. They are struggling hard to reach a decision. May I say to them that you will stand behind them?"

The crowd in the hall backed Hitler with a roar of approval. He finished triumphantly:

You can see that what motivates us is neither self-conceit nor self-interest, but only a burning desire to join the battle in this grave eleventh hour for our German Fatherland ... One last thing I can tell you. Either the German revolution begins tonight or we will all be dead by dawn!

Hitler returned to the antechamber, where the triumvirs remained, to ear-shattering acclaim, which the triumvirs could not have failed to notice. On his way back, he ordered Göring and Hess to take Eugen von Knilling and seven other members of the Bavarian government into custody.

During Hitler's speech, Pöhner, Weber, and Kriebel had been trying in a conciliatory fashion to bring the triumvirate round to their point of view. The atmosphere in the room had become lighter, but Kahr continued to dig in his heels. Ludendorff showed up a little before 21:00 and, being shown into the antechamber, concentrated on Lossow and Seisser, appealing to their sense of duty. Eventually, the triumvirate reluctantly gave in.

Hitler, Ludendorff, et al., returned to the main hall's podium, where they gave speeches and shook hands. The crowd was then allowed to leave the hall. In a tactical mistake, Hitler decided to leave the Bürgerbräukeller shortly thereafter to deal with a crisis elsewhere. Around 22:30, Ludendorff released Kahr and his associates.

The Bund Oberland, under the command of Max Ritter von Müller, was sent to seize weapons from the Army Engineer Barracks under the pretense of performing training maneuvers. Oskar Cantzler, captain of the 1st company of the 7th Engineer Battalion, did not believe them, but allowed them to perform the maneuvers inside the building. He locked the building with the 400 men inside and positioned two machine guns at the entrance. Hitler attempted to have the men released, but Cantzler refused. Hitler considered using artillery to destroy the building, but chose not to.

The night was marked by confusion and unrest among government officials, armed forces, police units, and individuals deciding where their loyalties lay. Units of the Kampfbund were scurrying around to arm themselves from secret caches, and seizing buildings. At around 03:00, the first casualties of the putsch occurred when the local garrison of the Reichswehr spotted Röhm's men coming out of the beer hall. They were ambushed while trying to reach the Reichswehr barracks by soldiers and state police; shots were fired, but there were no fatalities on either side. Encountering heavy resistance, Röhm and his men were forced to fall back. In the meantime, the Reichswehr officers put the whole garrison on alert and called for reinforcements. Foreign attachés were seized in their hotel rooms and put under house arrest.

He further sent the communications officer of the Kampfbund, to enlist the aid of Crown Prince Rupprecht of Bavaria to mediate between Kahr and the putschists. Neunzert failed in the mission.

By mid-morning on 9 November, Hitler realised that the putsch was going nowhere. The putschists did not know what to do and were about to give up. At this moment, Ludendorff cried out, "Wir marschieren!" ('We will march!'). Röhm's force together with Hitler's (a total of approximately 2000 men) marched out – but with no specific destination. On the spur of the moment, Ludendorff led them to the Bavarian Defence Ministry. However, at the Odeonsplatz in front of the Feldherrnhalle, they met a force of 130 soldiers blocking the way under the command of State Police Senior Lieutenant . The two groups exchanged fire which eventually resulted in the deaths of four state police officers and 16 Nazis.

Although their defeat by the government forces forced Hitler and Ludendorff to flee Munich, it was the origin of the Blutfahne ('blood flag'), which was stained with the blood of two SA members who were shot: the flag bearer Heinrich Trambauer, who was badly wounded, and Andreas Bauriedl, who fell dead onto the fallen flag. A bullet killed Scheubner-Richter. Göring was shot in the leg, but escaped. The rest of the Nazis scattered or were arrested. Hitler was arrested two days later.

In a description of Ludendorff's funeral at the Feldherrnhalle in 1937 (which Hitler attended but without speaking) William L. Shirer wrote: "The World War [One] hero [Ludendorff] had refused to have anything to do with him [Hitler] ever since he had fled from in front of the Feldherrnhalle after the volley of bullets during the Beer Hall Putsch." However, when a consignment of papers relating to Landsberg prison (including the visitor book) were later sold at auction, it was noted that Ludendorff had visited Hitler a number of times. The case of the resurfacing papers was reported in Der Spiegel on 23 June 2006; the new information (which came out more than 30 years after Shirer wrote his book, and which Shirer did not have access to) nullifies Shirer's statement.

Counterattack   
Police units were first notified of trouble by three police detectives stationed at the Löwenbräukeller. These reports reached Major Sigmund von Imhoff of the state police. He immediately called all his green police units and had them seize the central telegraph office and the telephone exchange, although his most important act was to notify Major-General Jakob von Danner, the Reichswehr city commandant of Munich. As a proud war hero, Danner loathed the "little corporal" and those "Freikorps bands of rowdies". He also did not much like his commanding officer, Generalleutnant Otto von Lossow, "a sorry figure of a man". He was determined to put down the putsch with or without Lossow. Danner set up a command post at the 19th Infantry Regiment barracks and alerted all military units.

Meanwhile, Captain Karl Wild, learning of the putsch from marchers, mobilised his command to guard Kahr's government building, the Commissariat, with orders to shoot.

Around 23:00, Major-General von Danner, along with fellow generals  and Friedrich Freiherr Kress von Kressenstein, compelled Lossow to repudiate the putsch.

There was one member of the cabinet who was not at the Bürgerbräukeller: Franz Matt, the vice-premier and minister of education and culture. A staunchly conservative Roman Catholic, he was having dinner with the Archbishop of Munich, Cardinal Michael von Faulhaber and with the Nuncio to Bavaria, Archbishop Eugenio Pacelli (who would later become Pope Pius XII), when he learned of the putsch. He immediately telephoned Kahr. When he found the man vacillating and unsure, Matt made plans to set up a rump government-in-exile in Regensburg and composed a proclamation calling upon all police officers, members of the armed forces, and civil servants to remain loyal to the government. The action of these few men spelled doom for those attempting the putsch. The next day the archbishop and Rupprecht visited Kahr and persuaded him to repudiate Hitler.

Three thousand students from the University of Munich rioted and marched to the Feldherrnhalle to lay wreaths. They continued to riot until 9 November, when they learned of Hitler's arrest. Kahr and Lossow were called Judases and traitors.

Trial and prison 

Two days after the putsch, Hitler was arrested and charged with high treason in the special People's Court. Some of his fellow conspirators, including Rudolf Hess, were also arrested, while others, including Hermann Göring and Ernst Hanfstaengl, escaped to Austria. The Nazi Party's headquarters was raided, and its newspaper, the Völkischer Beobachter (The People's Observer), was banned. In January 1924, the Emminger Reform, an emergency decree, abolished the jury as trier of fact and replaced it with a mixed system of judges and lay judges in Germany's judiciary.

This was not the first time Hitler had been in trouble with the law. In an incident in September 1921, he and some men of the SA had disrupted a meeting of the Bayernbund ('Bavaria Union') which Otto Ballerstedt, a Bavarian federalist, was to have addressed, and the Nazi troublemakers were arrested as a result. Hitler ended up serving a little over a month of a three-month jail sentence. Judge Georg Neithardt was the presiding judge at both of Hitler's trials.

Hitler's trial began on 26 February 1924 and lasted until 1 April 1924. Lossow acted as chief witness for the prosecution. Hitler moderated his tone for the trial, centering his defence on his selfless devotion to the good of the people and the need for bold action to save them, dropping his usual anti-Semitism. He claimed the putsch had been his sole responsibility, inspiring the title Führer or 'leader'. The lay judges were fanatically pro-Nazi and had to be dissuaded by the presiding Judge, Georg Neithardt, from acquitting Hitler. Festungshaft was the mildest of the three types of jail sentence available in German law at the time; it excluded forced labour, provided reasonably comfortable cells, and allowed the prisoner to receive visitors almost daily for many hours. This was the customary sentence for those whom the judge believed to have had honourable but misguided motives, and it did not carry the stigma of a sentence of Gefängnis (common prison) or Zuchthaus (disciplinary prison). In the end, Hitler served only a little over eight months of this sentence before his early release for good behaviour. Prison officials allegedly wanted to give Hitler deaf guards, to prevent him from persuading them to free him.

Although the trial was the first time that Hitler's oratory was insufficient, he used the trial as an opportunity to spread his ideas by giving speeches to the court room. The event was extensively covered in the newspapers the next day. The judges were impressed (Presiding Judge Neithardt was inclined to favouritism towards the defendants prior to the trial), and as a result, Hitler served a little over eight months and was fined . Due to his story that he was present by accident, an explanation he had also used in the Kapp Putsch, along with his war service and connections, Ludendorff was acquitted. Both Röhm and Wilhelm Frick, though found guilty, were released. Göring, meanwhile, had fled after suffering a bullet wound to his leg, which led him to become increasingly dependent on morphine and other painkilling drugs. This addiction continued throughout his life.

One of Hitler's greatest worries at the trial was that he was at risk of being deported back to his native Austria by the Bavarian government. The trial judge, Neithardt, was sympathetic toward Hitler and held that the relevant laws of the Weimar Republic could not be applied to a man "who thinks and feels like a German, as Hitler does." The result was that the Nazi leader remained in Germany.

Though Hitler failed to achieve his immediate goal, the putsch did give the Nazis their first national attention and propaganda victory. While serving their "fortress confinement" sentences at Landsberg am Lech, Hitler, Emil Maurice and Rudolf Hess wrote Mein Kampf. The putsch had changed Hitler's outlook on violent revolution to effect change. From then his modus operandi was to do everything "strictly legal".

The process of "combination", wherein the conservative-nationalist-monarchist group thought that its members could piggyback on, and control, the National Socialist movement to garner the seats of power, was to repeat itself ten years later in 1933 when Franz von Papen asked Hitler to form a legal coalition government.

Fatalities

Bavarian police 
 Friedrich Fink
 Nikolaus Hollweg
 Max Schobert
 Rudolf Schraut

Putschists 

The 16 deceased are listed in Hitler's dedication to Mein Kampf.
 Felix Allfarth, merchant, born 5 July 1901 in Leipzig. Alfarth had studied merchandising at the Siemens-Schuckert Works and moved to Munich in 1923 to begin his career.
 Andreas Bauriedl, hatter, born 4 May 1879 in Aschaffenburg. Bauriedl was hit in the abdomen, killing him and causing him to fall on the Nazi flag, which had fallen to the ground when its flagbearer, Heinrich Trambauer, was severely wounded. Bauriedl's blood-soaked flag later became the Nazi relic known as the Blutfahne.
 Theodor Casella, bank clerk, born 8 August 1900.
 Wilhelm Ehrlich, bank clerk, born 8 August 1894.
 Martin Faust, bank clerk, born 4 January 1901.
 Anton Hechenberger, locksmith, born 28 September 1902.
 Oskar Körner, businessman, born 4 January 1875 in Ober-Peilau.
 Karl Kuhn, head waiter in a restaurant, born 7 July 1875.
 Karl Laforce, engineering student, born 28 October 1904; the youngest to die in the putsch.
 Kurt Neubauer, valet, born 27 March 1899 in Hopfengarten, Kreis Bernberg.
 Klaus von Pape, businessman, born 16 August 1904 in Oschatz.
 Theodor von der Pfordten, county court counsel, who had fought in World War I; born 14 May 1873 in Bayreuth; the eldest to die in the putsch.
 Johann Rickmers, retired cavalry captain who had fought in World War I; born 7 May 1881 in Bremen.
 Max Erwin von Scheubner-Richter, Nazi leader, born 21 January 1884 in Riga.
 Lorenz Ritter von Stransky-Griffenfeld, engineer, born 14 March 1889.
 Wilhelm Wolf, businessman, born 19 October 1898.

Scheubner-Richter was walking arm-in-arm with Hitler during the putsch; he was shot in the lungs and died instantly. He brought Hitler down and dislocated Hitler's shoulder when he fell. He was the only significant Nazi leader to die during the putsch. Of all the party members who died in the putsch, Hitler claimed Scheubner-Richter to be the only "irreplaceable loss".

According to Ernst Röhm, Martin Faust and Theodor Casella, both members of the armed militia organisation Reichskriegsflagge, were shot down accidentally in a burst of machine gun fire during the occupation of the War Ministry as the result of a misunderstanding with II/Infantry Regiment 19.

Legacy

The 16 fallen insurgents were regarded as the first "blood martyrs" of the Nazi Party and were remembered by Hitler in the foreword of Mein Kampf. The Nazi flag they carried, which in the course of events had been stained with blood, came to be known as the Blutfahne ('blood flag') and was brought out for the swearing-in of new recruits in front of the Feldherrnhalle when Hitler was in power.

Shortly after he came to power, a memorial was placed at the south side of the Feldherrnhalle crowned with a swastika. The back of the memorial read Und ihr habt doch gesiegt! ('And you triumphed nevertheless!'). Behind it flowers were laid, and either policemen or the SS stood guard between a lower plaque. Passers-by were required to give the Nazi salute. The putsch was also commemorated on three sets of stamps. Mein Kampf was dedicated to the fallen and, in the book Ich Kämpfe (given to those joining the party c. 1943), they are listed first even though the book lists hundreds of other dead. The header text in the book read "Though they are dead for their acts they will live on forever." The army had a division named the Feldherrnhalle Regiment, and there was also an SA Feldherrnhalle Division.

Der neunte Elfte (9 November, literally 'the ninth of the eleventh') became one of the most important dates on the Nazi calendar, especially following the seizure of power in 1933. Annually until the fall of Nazi Germany, the putsch would be commemorated nationwide, with the major events taking place in Munich. On the night of 8 November, Hitler would address the Alte Kämpfer ('Old Fighters') in the Bürgerbräukeller (after 1939, the Löwenbräu, in 1944 in the Circus Krone Building), followed the next day by a re-enactment of the march through the streets of Munich. The event would climax with a ceremony recalling the 16 dead marchers on the Königsplatz.

The anniversary could be a time of tension in Nazi Germany. The ceremony was cancelled in 1934, coming as it did after the so-called Night of the Long Knives. In 1938, it coincided with the Kristallnacht, and in 1939 with the attempted assassination of Hitler by Johann Georg Elser. With the outbreak of war in 1939, security concerns caused the re-enactment of the march to be suspended, never to be resumed. However, Hitler continued to deliver his 8 November speech through 1943. In 1944, Hitler skipped the event and Heinrich Himmler spoke in his place. As the war went on, residents of Munich came increasingly to dread the approach of the anniversary, concerned that the presence of the top Nazi leaders in their city would act as a magnet for Allied bombers.

Every Gau (administrative region of Germany) was also expected to hold a small remembrance ceremony. As material given to propagandists said, the 16 fallen were the first losses and the ceremony was an occasion to commemorate everyone who had died for the movement.

On 9 November 1935, the dead were taken from their graves and to the Feldherrnhalle. The SA and SS carried them down to the Königsplatz, where two Ehrentempel ('honour temples') had been constructed. In each of the structures eight of the dead Nazis were interred in a sarcophagus bearing their name.

In June 1945 the Allied Commission removed the bodies from the Ehrentempels and contacted their families. They were given the option of having their loved ones buried in Munich cemeteries in unmarked graves or having them cremated, common practice in Germany for unclaimed bodies. On 9 January 1947, the upper parts of the structures were blown up.

Since 1994, a commemorative plaque embedded in the pavement in front of the Feldherrnhalle contains the names of the four Bavarian policemen who died in the fight against the Nazis. The plaque reads:

In popular culture

A paraphrased part of Hitler's speech to the court (narrated by actor Chris Barrie) was featured in the extended version of the 1984 anti-war song "Two Tribes" by the British band Frankie Goes to Hollywood: "You may pronounce us guilty a thousand times over, but the Goddess of the Eternal Court of History will smile and tear to tatters the brief of the State Prosecutor and the sentence of this court, for She acquits us."

Supporters of the Putsch

Key supporters 

 Adolf Hitler
 Rudolf Hess
 Hermann Göring
 Alfred Rosenberg
 Erich Ludendorff
 Ernst Röhm
 Julius Streicher
 Hermann Kriebel
 Friedrich Weber
 Max Erwin von Scheubner-Richter
 Ulrich Graf
 Hermann Esser
 Ernst Hanfstaengl
 Gottfried Feder
 Joseph Berchtold
 Ernst Pöhner
 Emil Maurice
 Max Amann
 Heinz Pernet
 Wilhelm Brückner
 Lt. Robert Wagner

Other notable supporters 

 Heinrich Himmler
 Edmund Heines
 Gerhard Roßbach
 Hans Frank
 Julius Schaub
 Walther Hewel
 Dietrich Eckart
 Wilhelm Frick
 Julius Schreck
 Josef 'Sepp' Dietrich
 Philipp Bouhler
 Franz Pfeffer von Salomon
 Gustav Adolf Lenk
 Gregor Strasser
 Hans Kallenbach
 Ernst Rüdiger Starhemberg
 Adolf Wagner
 Jakob Grimminger
 Heinrich Trambauer
 Karl Beggel
 Rudolf Jung
 Rudolf Buttmann
 Albrecht von Graefe
 Hans Ulrich Klintzsch
 Heinrich Hoffmann
 Josef Gerum
 Capt. Eduard Dietl
 Hans Georg Hofmann
 Matthaeus Hofmann
 Helmut Klotz
 Adolf Hühnlein
 Max Neunzert
 Michael Ried
 Karl Fischer von Treuenfeld
 Theodor Oberländer
 Eleonore Baur

At the front of the march 
In the vanguard were four flag bearers followed by Adolf Lenk and Kurt Neubauer, Ludendorff's servant. Behind those two came more flag bearers, then the leadership in two rows.

Hitler was in the centre, slouch hat in hand, the collar of his trenchcoat turned up against the cold. To his left, in civilian clothes, a green felt hat, and a loose loden coat, was Ludendorff. To Hitler's right was Scheubner-Richter. To his right came Alfred Rosenberg. On either side of these men were Ulrich Graf, Hermann Kriebel, Friedrich Weber, Julius Streicher, Hermann Göring, and Wilhelm Brückner.

Behind these came the second string of Heinz Pernet, Johann Aigner (Scheubner-Richter's servant), Gottfried Feder, Theodor von der Pfordten, Wilhelm Kolb, Rolf Reiner, Hans Streck, and Heinrich Bennecke, Brückner's adjutant.

Behind this row marched the Stoßtrupp-Hitler, the SA, the Infantry School, and the Oberländer.

Chief defendants in the "Ludendorff–Hitler" trial 

 Wilhelm Brückner
 Wilhelm Frick
 Adolf Hitler
 Hermann Kriebel
 Erich Ludendorff

 Heinz Pernet
 Ernst Röhm
 Lt. Robert Wagner
 Friedrich Weber

See also 

 2022 German coup d'état plot
 Bavarian Soviet Republic
 Blood Order – A commemorative award given to participants
 Blutfahne
 German October
 German Revolution
 Hamburg Uprising
 Kapp Putsch
 March Action
 Early Nazism timeline
 Spartacist Uprising
 Weimar Republic timeline

 People given posthumous fame by the Nazis:
 Wilhelm Gustloff
 Horst Wessel
 Herbert Norkus

References
Informational notes

Citations

Bibliography
 
 Dornberg, John (1982). Munich 1923: The Story of Hitler's First Grab for Power. New York: Harper & Row.
 
 Gordon, Harold J., Jr. (1972). Hitler and the Beer Hall Putsch. Princeton, NJ: Princeton University Press.
 Gordon, Harold J., Jr. (1976). The Hitler Trial Before the People's Court in Munich. University Publications of America.
 
 
 
 Large, David Clay (1997). Where Ghosts Walked, Munich's Road to the Third Reich. New York: W.W. Norton.
 
 Snyder, Louis Leo (1961). Hitler and Nazism. New York: Franklin Watts.

External links 

 Map of Europe at time of Beer Hall Putsch at omniatlas.com
 The Feldherrnhalle with the plaque to the four Bavarians killed, now removed
 "Munich: Part 3 – Nazi Party Buildings on the Königsplatz Third Reich in Ruins

 
Rebellions in Germany
Adolf Hitler
Attempted coups in Germany
1920s coups d'état and coup attempts
Conflicts in 1923
1923 in Germany
1924 in Germany
Military operations involving Germany
November 1923 events in Europe
1920s in Munich
Fascist revolts